Aaron Zook and Abner Zook (January 21, 1921 – 2003/2010) were Amish identical twins and visual artists known for their 3D artwork primarily pertaining to Amish culture.

Aaron and Abner Zook were born in Lancaster, Pennsylvania, to Amos and Annie (King) Zook. The brothers became well known artists for their 3D paintings. Between the two of them they amassed over a thousand Amish-life-inspired 3D paintings. Their work has become highly collectible among art dealers.

References

1921 births
Identical twins
2003 deaths
2010 deaths
People from Lancaster, Pennsylvania
American Amish people